Pogănesti is the village of residence of the commune of the same name in Hîncești District, Moldova. It is composed of two villages, Marchet and Pogănești.

References

Communes of Hîncești District
Populated places on the Prut